Copromyxella is a genus of Amoebozoa.

It includes the species Copromyxella coralloides.

References

Amoebozoa genera